Filipacchi is a surname. Notable people with the surname include:

Amanda Filipacchi (born 1967), American writer
Daniel Filipacchi (born 1928), the Chairman Emeritus of Hachette Filipacchi Médias

See also
Hachette Filipacchi Médias (HFM), the largest magazine publisher in the world
Hachette Filipacchi Media U.S. (HFM U.S.), subsidiary of Hachette Filipacchi Médias, based in New York City

Italian-language surnames
Patronymic surnames
Surnames from given names